The Chinatown in Newcastle is a district of Newcastle upon Tyne, located in the west of the city, on the edge of the shopping and commercial centre, along Stowell Street. It is one of five Chinatowns in England, with the other four being in London, Birmingham, Manchester, and Liverpool.

Location
The Chinatown lies within the historic heart of Newcastle, Grainger Town, on land that was once part of Blackfriars monastery. Stowell Street and one of the few still extant stretches of Newcastle town wall mark the northeast boundary of the district. At the north end of Stowell Street on St Andrew's Street is the Chinese arch, facing St James' Park. South and west of Stowell Street, on the streets and passages around Blackfriars and The Gate including Charlotte Square and Low Friar Street, are a number of other businesses including restaurants, food shops and cafés.

History
The first Chinese restaurant in Newcastle, the Marlborough Café, opened on Scotswood Road in 1949. Another fourteen restaurants opened up to 1962, but none on Stowell Street. The first business to open there was a Chinese supermarket, now the Wing Hong store, which moved to Stowell Street from Westgate Road in 1978, to be followed by many other businesses. In 1988 businesses along Stowell Street were allowed to have signs in Chinese as well as English. 22 Chinese style lanterns were installed in Stowell Street to replace the existing street lights in 2008.

Chinese arch
A Chinese arch, built in 2004 by Shanghai craftsmen, stands 11m tall on St. Andrews Street, at the northernmost extent of the Chinatown, flanked by two Chinese guardian lions and facing St James' Park football stadium.

Events
Lunar New Year is celebrated in and around Chinatown every year, usually on a day in late January or early February. In 2015 this took place on 22 February.

Gallery

See also
 Morden Tower

References

External links

 A History of the Chinese Community in Newcastle-upon-Tyne Since 1940 North East Chinese Association, archived from  the original
 Newcastle Chinatown information

Newcastle
Newcastle
Districts of Newcastle upon Tyne
Restaurant districts and streets in England